Samuel Carr Forker (March 16, 1821 – February 10, 1900) was a Democratic Party politician who represented New Jersey's 2nd congressional district in the United States House of Representatives for one term from 1871 to 1873.

Early life and education
Forker was born in Mount Holly Township, New Jersey on March 16, 1821. He completed preparatory studies, moved to Bordentown, New Jersey and engaged in banking. He was director and cashier of the Bordentown Banking Company.

Congress
Forker was elected as a Democrat to the Forty-second Congress, serving in office from March 4, 1871 – March 3, 1873, but was an unsuccessful candidate for reelection in 1872 to the Forty-third Congress.

Retirement and death
After leaving Congress, he again engaged in banking. He moved to Delanco Township, New Jersey in 1890, and lived in retirement with his son until his death in Edgewater Park Township, New Jersey on February 10, 1900. He was interred in Mount Holly Cemetery.

References

External links

Samuel Carr Forker at The Political Graveyard

1821 births
1900 deaths
People from Bordentown, New Jersey
People from Delanco Township, New Jersey
People from Edgewater Park, New Jersey
Democratic Party members of the United States House of Representatives from New Jersey
People from Mount Holly, New Jersey
American bankers
19th-century American politicians
19th-century American businesspeople